Midget (from midge, a tiny biting insect) is a term for a person of unusually short stature that is considered by some to be pejorative due to its etymology. While not a medical term like dwarf (for a person with dwarfism, a medical condition with a number of causes, most often achondroplasia), midget long described anyone, or indeed any animal, exhibiting proportionate dwarfism. The word has a history of association with the performance arts, as little people were often employed by acts in the circus,
professional wrestling and vaudeville.

The term may also refer to anything of much smaller than normal size, as a synonym for "miniature" or "mini", such as midget cell, midget crabapple, midget flowerpecker, midget submarine, MG Midget, Daihatsu Midget, and the Midget Mustang airplane; or to anything that regularly uses anything that is smaller than normal (other than a person), such as midget car racing and quarter midget racing.

"Midget" may also reference a smaller version of play or participation, such as midget golf; or to anything designed for very young (i.e., small) participants—in many cases children—such as Disneyland's Midget Autopia, midget hockey, and midget football. Some sports organizations, like Hockey Canada, have committed to removing the word, recognizing that it might be considered offensive.

History

Merriam-Webster states that the first use of the term "midget" was in 1816.

Midgets have always been popular entertainers but were often regarded with disgust and revulsion in society. In the early 19th century, midgets were romanticized by the middle class and regarded with the same affectionate condescension extended to children, as creatures of innocence. The term "midget" came into prominence in the mid-19th century after Harriet Beecher Stowe used it in her novels Sunny Memories of Foreign Lands and Old Town Folks where she described children and an extremely short man, respectively. P. T. Barnum indirectly helped popularize the term "midget" when he began featuring General Tom Thumb, Lavinia Warren and Commodore Nutt in his circus. "Midget" became linked to referencing short people put on public display for curiosity and sport. Barnum's midgets reached position of high society, given fantasy military titles, introduced to dignitaries and royalty, and showered with gifts.

Such performances continued to be widespread through the mid part of the twentieth century, with Hermines Midgets brought from their performances in Paris to appear at the 1939 New York World's Fair, the same year that MGM released The Wizard of Oz, which featured 124 little people in its cast, most of whom were from the Singer's Midgets troupe.

When interviewed for a 1999 piece, performers engaged in midget wrestling stated that they did not view the term as derogatory but merely descriptive of their small size. Others disagreed, with one stating that the performances themselves perpetuated an outdated and demeaning image.

Towards the end of the 20th century, the word became considered by some as a pejorative term when referencing people with dwarfism. Some, such as actor Hervé Villechaize continued to self-identify as "midgets".

In March 2023, former NBA star and Hall of Famer Bill Walton was criticized for using the term during a television broadcast of a college basketball game.

There have been movements to remove the use of the word "midget" from age classification categories in youth sports, with Hockey Canada announcing that it would refer to the division as "U18" in 2020 as part of a wider renaming scheme.

See also

List of dwarfism organisations
Dwarf-tossing
Midgetville
Singer's Midgets
Midgets vs. Mascots
Pygmy peoples
Munchkin
Oompa Loompa
Leprechaun
Dwarf
Elf
Santa's elves

Notes

References

Growth disorders
Human height
Pejorative terms for people with disabilities